The Good Governance and Anti-Corruption Commission of Somaliland abbreviated as GGACC  is a Somaliland government agency charged to combat corruption practices and to advice and ascertain a good governance system in Somaliland.
The current head of the agency is Dayib Adan Haji Ali.

Overview
The GGACC consists of five member committee and was established on 26 August 2010 by the Somaliland's president at the time Ahmed Mohamed Mohamoud by presidential decree, and was approved by the Parliament of Somaliland on 6 November 2012. The chairman and the vice chairman shall be elected by the members of the commission and will be approved by the majority of the members.

See also

 Civil Service Commission (Somaliland)
 National Electoral Commission (Somaliland)
 Politics of Somaliland

References

External links
GGACC Establishment Law
GGACC Official Website 

Politics of Somaliland
Government agencies of Somaliland